Edmund Pendleton (1721–1803) was a Virginia politician, lawyer and judge.

Edmund Pendleton may also refer to:

Edmund H. Pendleton (1788–1862), U.S. Representative from New York, his great-nephew
Edmund J. Pendleton (1899–1987), American organist, composer and conductor who lived much of his life in Paris, France

See also
Edmund Pendleton Gaines, U.S. general, another grandnephew of Edmund Pendleton (1721)